Father's Chair is a 2012 Brazilian drama film directed by Luciano Moura. It follows the story of Theo, a man who always gave priority to career, until the day that his 15-year-old son goes missing. It was shot in Campinas, Paulínia, and in the coast of the state of São Paulo. The film was selected for the World Cinema at 2012 Sundance Film Festival and for the Première Brasil at 2012 Festival do Rio.

Plot
Theo is a doctor that leads a good life in a wealthy Brazilian neighborhood. He always gave priority to work, leaving the family at second plan, but little by little Theo discovers that everything around him is collapsing. His mentor and father figure is dying and his wife wants to divorce him. But nothing could prepare him for the day that his 15-year-old son, Pedro, disappeared without a trace. Theo embarks on a quest that leads him through Brazil, discovering what really matters to him. Searching for his missing son, Theo finds himself.

Cast
Wagner Moura as Theo Gadelha
Mariana Lima as Branca
Lima Duarte as Emiliano Gadelha
Brás Antunes as Pedro
Abrahão Farc as Firmino

References

External links
 

2012 thriller drama films
2012 films
Brazilian thriller drama films
Films shot in Campinas
Films shot in Paulínia
2012 drama films